Fatigue describes a state of tiredness or exhaustion. In general usage, fatigue often follows prolonged physical or mental activity. When fatigue occurs independently of physical or mental exertion, or does not resolve after rest or sleep, it may have other causes, such as a medical condition.

Fatigue (in a medical context) often has no known cause, and is recognised as being complex in nature. Fatigue may be associated with conditions of chronic pain such as fibromyalgia, and with many other conditions, including autoimmune diseases. It can also be associated with mental disorders such as depression.

Fatigue (in the general usage sense of normal tiredness) can include both physical and mental fatigue. Physical fatigue results from muscle fatigue brought about by intense physical activity. Mental fatigue results from prolonged periods of cognitive activity which impairs cognitive ability. Mental fatigue can manifest as sleepiness, lethargy, or directed attention fatigue. Mental fatigue can also impair physical performance.

Definition
Fatigue in a medical context is used to cover experiences of low energy that are not caused by normal life.

Fatigue is multi-faceted and broadly defined, which makes understanding the cause of its manifestations especially difficult in conditions with diverse pathology including autoimmune diseases.

The use of the term "fatigue" in medical contexts may carry inaccurate connotations from the general usage of the word. More accurate terminology may also be needed to cover variants within the umbrella term of fatigue.

Comparison with sleepiness 
Fatigue is generally considered a more long-term condition than sleepiness (somnolence). Although sleepiness can be a symptom of a medical condition, it usually results from lack of restful sleep, or a lack of stimulation. Fatigue is often described as an uncomfortable tiredness, whereas sleepiness can be comfortable and inviting.

Classification

By effect

Overall life effect
Fatigue can have significant negative impacts on quality of life. Profound and debilitating fatigue is the most common complaint reported among individuals with autoimmune disease, such as systemic lupus erythematosus, multiple sclerosis, type 1 diabetes, celiac disease, chronic fatigue syndrome, and rheumatoid arthritis.

It is disputed whether there are different dimensions of fatigue, such as peripheral (muscle) and central (mental) fatigue, or whether fatigue is a uni-dimensional phenomenon that influences different aspects of human life.

Physical 
Physical fatigue, or muscle fatigue, is the temporary physical inability of muscles to perform optimally. The onset of muscle fatigue during physical activity is gradual, and depends upon an individual's level of physical fitness – other factors include sleep deprivation and overall health. Physical fatigue can be caused by a lack of energy in the muscle, by a decrease of the efficiency of the neuromuscular junction or by a reduction of the drive originating from the central nervous system, and can be reversed by rest. The central component of fatigue is triggered by an increase of the level of serotonin in the central nervous system. During motor activity, serotonin released in synapses that contact motor neurons promotes muscle contraction. During high level of motor activity, the amount of serotonin released increases and a spillover occurs. Serotonin binds to extrasynaptic receptors located on the axonal initial segment of motor neurons with the result that nerve impulse initiation and thereby muscle contraction are inhibited.

Muscle strength testing can be used to determine the presence of a neuromuscular disease, but cannot determine its cause. Additional testing, such as electromyography, can provide diagnostic information, but information gained from muscle strength testing alone is not enough to diagnose most neuromuscular disorders.

Mental   

 Mental fatigue is a temporary inability to maintain optimal cognitive performance. The onset of mental fatigue during any cognitive activity is gradual, and depends upon an individual's cognitive ability, and also upon other factors, such as sleep deprivation and overall health. 
 Mental fatigue has also been shown to decrease physical performance. It can manifest as somnolence, lethargy, directed attention fatigue, or disengagement. Research also suggests that mental fatigue is closely linked to the concept of ego depletion. For example, one pre-registered study of 686 participants found that after exerting mental effort, people are likely to disengage and become less interested in exerting further effort. 
 Decreased attention can also be described as a more or less decreased level of consciousness. In any case, this can be dangerous when performing tasks that require constant concentration, such as operating large vehicles. For instance, a person who is sufficiently somnolent may experience microsleep. However, objective cognitive testing can be used to differentiate the neurocognitive deficits of brain disease from those attributable to tiredness.

The perception of mental fatigue is believed to be modulated by the brain's reticular activating system (RAS).

Fatigue impacts a driver's reaction time, awareness of hazards around them and their attention. Drowsy drivers are three times more likely to be involved in a car crash and if they are awake over 20 hours, is the equivalent of driving with a blood-alcohol concentration level of 0.08%.

Neurological fatigue

 People with multiple sclerosis experience a form of overwhelming tiredness that can occur at any time of the day, for any duration, and that does not necessarily recur in a recognizable pattern for any given patient, referred to as "neurological fatigue", and often as "multiple sclerosis fatigue" or "lassitude".
 People with inflammatory rheumatic diseases, including rheumatoid arthritis, psoriatic arthritis and primary Sjogren's Syndrome, experience similar fatigue.

Multiple subsets often present
Patients very often present with many types or subsets of fatigue.

By timescale

Acute 
Causes of acute fatigue include depression; chemical causes, such as dehydration, poisoning, low blood sugar, or mineral or vitamin deficiencies. Fatigue is different from drowsiness, where a patient feels that sleep is required.

Temporary fatigue is likely to be a minor illness like the common cold as one part of the sickness behavior response that happens when the immune system fights an infection.

Prolonged 
Prolonged fatigue is a self-reported, persistent (constant) fatigue lasting at least one month.

Chronic 
Chronic fatigue is a self-reported fatigue lasting at least six consecutive months. Chronic fatigue may be either persistent or relapsing.

By causal mechanism

The mechanisms that cause fatigue are not well understood.

Inflammation 
Inflammation distorts neural chemistry, brain function and functional connectivity across a broad range of brain networks, and has been linked to many types of fatigue. Findings implicate neuroinflammation in the etiology of fatigue in autoimmune and related disorders. 
Low-grade inflammation may cause an imbalance between energy availability and expenditure. Cytokines are small protein molecules that modulate immune responses and inflammation (as well as other functions) and may have causal roles in fatigue.

However the inflammation model may have difficulty in explaining the "unpredictability" and "variability" (i.e. appearing intermittently during the day, and not on all days) of the fatigue associated with inflammatory rheumatic diseases and autoimmune diseases (such as multiple sclerosis).

Heat shock proteins
A small 2016 study found that primary Sjögren’s syndrome patients with high fatigue, when compared with those with low fatigue, had significantly higher plasma concentrations of HSP90α, and a tendency to higher concentrations of HSP72.

By causal factor

Fatigue is often undiagnosed.

Side effect of medications
Fatigue may be a side effect of certain medications (e.g., lithium salts, ciprofloxacin); beta blockers, which can induce exercise intolerance; and many cancer treatments, particularly chemotherapy and radiotherapy.

Side effects of drug use
Caffeine and alcohol can cause fatigue.

Obesity
Obesity appears to correlate with greater fatigue incidence.

Psychological effects
Depression and adverse life events have been associated with fatigue. A 2019 study found that rheumatoid arthritis fatigue impacts can be improved for 2 years by cognitive behavioural approaches.

Association with diseases

Fatigue is often associated with diseases and conditions. Some major categories of conditions that often list fatigue as a symptom include:

 Autoimmune diseases, such as celiac disease, lupus, multiple sclerosis, myasthenia gravis, Sjögren's syndrome, and spondyloarthropathy
 Anxiety disorders such as generalized anxiety disorder
 Blood disorders such as anemia and hemochromatosis
 Brain injury
 Cancer, in which case it is called cancer fatigue
 Chronic fatigue syndrome (CFS)
 Covid-19; long covid.
 Substance use disorders including alcohol use disorder
 Depression and other mental disorders that feature depressed mood
 Developmental disorders such as autism spectrum disorder
 Eating disorders, which can produce fatigue due to inadequate nutrition
 Endocrine diseases or metabolic disorders: diabetes mellitus, hypothyroidism and Addison’s disease
 Fibromyalgia
 Gulf War syndrome
 Heart failure
 HIV
 Idiopathic chronic fatigue (ICF), which is chronic fatigue with no known cause that does not meet chronic fatigue syndrome criteria
 Inborn errors of metabolism such as fructose malabsorption.
 Infectious diseases such as infectious mononucleosis or tuberculosis
 Irritable bowel syndrome
 Kidney diseases e.g. acute renal failure, chronic renal failure
 Leukemia or lymphoma
 Liver failure or liver diseases e.g. Hepatitis
 Lyme disease
 Neurological disorders such as narcolepsy, Parkinson's disease, Postural Orthostatic Tachycardia Syndrome and post-concussion syndrome
 Physical trauma and other pain-causing conditions, such as arthritis
 Sleep deprivation or sleep disorders, e.g. sleep apnea
 Stroke
 Thyroid disease such as hypothyroidism

Primary vs secondary
In some areas it has been proposed that fatigue be separated into primary fatigue, caused directly by a disease process, and secondary fatigue, caused by more general impacts on the person of having a disease (such as disrupted sleep).

Tiredness
Fatigue is sometimes used to describe the tiredness which is a normal result of work, mental stress, anxiety, overstimulation and understimulation, jet lag, active recreation, boredom, or lack of sleep.

Measurement 
Fatigue is currently measured by many different self-measurement surveys. There is no consensus on best practice, and the existing surveys do not capture the intermittent nature of some forms of fatigue.

Nintendo announced plans for a device to possibly quantitatively measure fatigue in 2014, but the project was stopped in 2016.

Diagnosis 

One study concluded about 50% of people who have fatigue receive a diagnosis that could explain the fatigue after a year with the condition. In those people who have a possible diagnosis, musculoskeletal (19.4%) and psychological problems (16.5%) are the most common. Definitive physical conditions were only found in 8.2% of cases.

If a person with fatigue decides to seek medical advice, the overall goal is to identify and rule out any treatable conditions. This is done by considering the person's medical history, any other symptoms that are present, and evaluating of the qualities of the fatigue itself. The affected person may be able to identify patterns to the fatigue, such as being more tired at certain times of day, whether fatigue increases throughout the day, and whether fatigue is reduced after taking a nap.

Because disrupted sleep is a significant contributor to fatigue, a diagnostic evaluation considers the quality of sleep, the emotional state of the person, sleep pattern, and stress level. The amount of sleep, the hours that are set aside for sleep, and the number of times that a person awakens during the night are important. A sleep study may be ordered to rule out a sleep disorder.

Depression and other psychological conditions can produce fatigue, so people who report fatigue are routinely screened for these conditions, along with substance use disorders, poor diet, and lack of physical exercise, which paradoxically increases fatigue.

Basic medical tests may be performed to rule out common causes of fatigue. These include blood tests to check for infection or anemia, a urinalysis to look for signs of liver disease or diabetes mellitus, and other tests to check for kidney and liver function, such as a comprehensive metabolic panel. Other tests may be chosen depending on the patient's social history, such as an HIV test or pregnancy test.

Management

Management recommendations may include the following;

Review existing meds
Medications are reviewed as some have side effects that may contribute to fatigue and the interactions of medications are complex.

Consider lifestyle changes
Reductions in obesity and in caffeine and alcohol intake may reduce fatigue.

Medications

The UK NICE recommends consideration of amantadine, modafinil and SSRIs for MS fatigue. Psychostimulants such as methylphenidate, amphetamines, and modafinil have been used in the treatment of fatigue related to depression, chronic fatigue syndrome, and medical illness such as cancer. They have also been used to counteract fatigue in sleep loss and in aviation.

Possible treatments

Bright light may reduce MS-related fatigue.

Shorts bursts of low-voltage electricity, applied to the side of the neck, may reduce fatigue.

See also 

 Affect
 Cancer-related fatigue
 Central governor
 Combat stress reaction
 Directed attention fatigue
 Effects of fatigue on safety
 Feeling
 Gaucher's disease
 Heat illness
 Malaise
 Microsleep
 Museum fatigue
 Presenteeism
 Sleep-deprived driving
 Pacing (activity management)
 Zoom fatigue

References

Further reading 
 Byung-Chul Han: Müdigkeitsgesellschaft. Matthes & Seitz, Berlin 2010, . (Philosophical essay about fatigue as a sociological problem and symptom).
 Danish edition: Træthedssamfundet. Møller, 2012, .
 Dutch edition: De vermoeide samenleving. van gennep, 2012, .
 Italian editions: La società della stanchezza. nottetempo, 2012, .
 Korean edition: 한병철 지음 | 김태환 옮김. Moonji, 2011, .
 Spanish edition: La sociedad del cansancio. Herder Editorial, 2012, .

External links 

 Fatigue –  Information for Patients, U.S. National Cancer Institute

Exercise physiology
Symptoms
Subjective experience